Baron Ilya Mikhailovich Duka (1768–28 February 1830) was a Russian general in the Napoleonic Wars.

Biography
Ilya Mikhailovich Duka came from a Serbian family that emigrated to Russia, established in the Kursk Governorate. In May 1776, he joined the infantry at Shlisselburg (formerly Nöteborg) near St. Petersburg. In 1783 he fought against Polish confederates alongside the Russian Imperial Army and was promoted to aide-de-camp to Major-General Ivan Šević, the grandson of Jovan Šević.

He participated in the Russo-Turkish campaign in 1788-89 and was transferred to the Ostrogozh Light Cavalry Regiment in 1790. During the campaign in Poland in 1794, he distinguished himself by capturing General Tomasz Wawrzecki and his officers, and was promoted to major. In October 1799, he was transferred to the Life Guard Hussar Regiment and promoted to colonel. On 23 October 1806, Duka was appointed chef of the Little Russia Cuirassier Regiment. He took part in the 1807 Campaign and distinguished himself at Eylau, being awarded the Order of St. George (3rd Class) and a Golden Weapon "For Bravery". He was promoted to major general on 6 June 1807.

In 1812, Duka commanded the 2nd Brigade of the 2nd Cuirassier Division, and later commanded the division itself. For his actions at Smolensk and Borodino, Duka was awarded the Order of St. Anna (1st Class) and for the battles of Tarutino and Maloyaroslavets—the Order of St. Vladimir (2nd Class). In 1813, Duka was promoted to lieutenant general (27 September), fought at Leipzig and was wounded in the head. In 1814 he participated in the capture of Paris. He was awarded the Prussian Order of the Red Eagle and the Austrian Order of St. Leopold.

Upon his return to Russia, Duka commanded the 2nd Cuirassier Division and in September 1823, he was appointed to command the 2nd Reserve Cavalry Corps. In September 1826, he was promoted to the general of cavalry, the next highest rank to Field marshal, and then retired on 17 February 1827 because of ill health.
He died on 28 February 1830.

See also
 Peter Mikhailovich Kaptzevich
 Peter Ivanovich Ivelich
 Ivan Shevich
 Andrei Miloradovich
 Avram Ratkov
 Ivan Adamovich
 Nikolay Bogdanov
 Nikolay Depreradovich
 Ivan Lukačević (soldier)
 Jovan Šević
 Jovan Albanez
 Simeon Piščević
 Anto Gvozdenović
 Mikhail Miloradovich
 Semyon Zorich
 Peter Tekeli
 Georgi Emmanuel
 Dejan Subotić
 Fedor Yakovlevich Mirkovich
 Marko Ivelich
 Rajko Depreradović

References 

Imperial Russian Army generals
1768 births
1830 deaths
People from the Russian Empire of Serbian descent
Russian nobility